Compiano is a medieval walled town in the Taro Valley (Parmesan Apennines), a 50 minute-drive to the Ligurian Sea and to Parma.

The top of Compiano's hill is home to the medieval Castello di Compiano.

History
It was said the Grimaldis, the Royal Family of Monaco, have their roots right here. A marble plate hung on the castle wall reports all the royal families that have inhabited the castle since the year 800 AD.